Solariella cincta is a species of sea snail, a marine gastropod mollusk in the family Solariellidae.

Description

Distribution
This species can be found in the Northern Atlantic and off the coasts of West Africa. In the past, during the Late Pliocene, it had a wider distribution and occurred as well in the Mediterranean as off the coast of present Spain and Portugal.

References

 Philippi R. A., 1836: Enumeratio molluscorum Siciliae cum viventium tum in tellure tertiaria fossilium, quae in itinere suo observavit. Vol. 1 ; Schropp, Berlin [Berolini] xiv + 267 p., pl. 1–12
 Gofas, S.; Le Renard, J.; Bouchet, P. (2001). Mollusca, in: Costello, M.J. et al. (Ed.) (2001). European register of marine species: a check-list of the marine species in Europe and a bibliography of guides to their identification. Collection Patrimoines Naturels, 50: pp. 180–213

External links
 Locard, A. (1897-1898). Expéditions scientifiques du Travailleur et du Talisman pendant les années 1880, 1881, 1882 et 1883. Mollusques testacés. Paris, Masson
 Williams S.T., Kano Y., Warén A. & Herbert D.G. (2020). Marrying molecules and morphology: first steps towards a reevaluation of solariellid genera (Gastropoda: Trochoidea) in the light of molecular phylogenetic studies. Journal of Molluscan Studies. 86(1): 1–26

cincta
Gastropods described in 1836
Taxa named by Rodolfo Amando Philippi